O’Death (stylized as o'death) is an American gothic country band from Brooklyn, New York. They combine elements of folk, bluegrass, punk, metal, gothic and Americana music.

History
All the members of O'Death met between the years of 2000 and 2003 at SUNY Purchase.  With Greg Jamie on guitar and vocals, Gabe Darling on electric guitar, ukulele, piano, and vocals, David Rogers-Berry on drums, Robert Pycior on violin, and Andrew Platt on bass - O'Death put together a very raw, 10-track CD-R, entitled Carl Nemelka Family Photographs, recorded by Joshua Benash (of the bands Kiss Kiss and Vuvuzela) in 2004.

In 2005, Gabe Darling switched to banjo and ukulele, the band added bass player Jesse Newman to the permanent lineup, and O'Death played a year-long monthly residency at the now defunct Apocalypse Lounge in NYC.  The band built a local fan base around their irreverent take on Americana by playing dive bars in the East Village and house parties around Brooklyn, as they worked on new material for their second self-released LP, Head Home.  In 2006, they took the stage alongside acts such as Battles, Dr. Dog, Art Brute, Langhorne Slim, THEUSAISAMONSTER, and Old Time Relijun in New York City, and began touring the United States.

The band's nonstop touring caught the attention of the New York-based Ernest Jenning Record Co., who re-released Head Home in June, 2007. Later that summer, Germany-based label City Slang released Head Home in Europe.

O'Death continued to tour the US and Europe throughout 2007, putting out a limited edition (500 copies) vinyl version of Head Home on Ernest Jenning Record Co./City Slang, followed by a 7" single of two new songs, "Low Tide" and "I Think I'm Fine," as well as a cover of Pixies' "Nimrod's Son" as an internet bonus track. Head Home was nominated for a 2007 Shortlist Prize.

On February 5, 2008, Gigantic Music released a new 7", which features the songs "Spider Home" and "Silk Hole".  In August 2008, City Slang released O'Death's second LP, Broken Hymns, across Europe and Australia.  The record was released in the United States later that year by Kemado Records..  The album included a new version of the single, "Lowtide," with a video directed by Oscar-nominated, Benh Zeitlin.  Kemado Records also released a 7" single in 2009 for the song, "Underwater Nightmare," b-sided with a cover of "Mongoloid" by Devo, and an original song called, "Prince of Beasts."  In this time, O'Death toured with Murder By Death, and later on with Les Claypool, playing main support to both artists. The band also participated on Vincent Moon's The Take-Away Shows and a Ukulele Session for the Belgian newspaper Le Soir, recorded by Noahm in their studio (New York).

After being on hiatus due to David Rogers-Berry undergoing cancer treatment, they released the album, Outside, in April, 2011. The first single, "Bugs," from the album was released on 26 January 2011, and the band toured extensively in the US and Europe in support of the record.

The band's newest album, Out Of Hands We Go, was released in October 2014 on Northern Spy Records. The album was recorded and mixed by Caleb Mulkerin (of Big Blood, Fire on Fire, and Cerberus Shoal) in South Portland, ME.

Discography

Albums
 Carl Nemelka Family Photographs (Self-released, 2004)
 Head Home (Self-released, 2006; Ernest Jenning Record Co., 2007)
 Broken Hymns, Limbs and Skin (Kemado Records, 2008)
 Outside (Ernest Jenning Record Co., 2011)
 Out of Hands We Go (Northern Spy Records, 2014)

EPs and singles
 Carl Nemelka Family Photographs EP (Self-released, 2005)
 “Low Tide” / ”I Think I’m Fine” / “Nimrod’s Son” 7” (Ernest Jenning Record Co., 2007)
 “Spider Home” / “Silk Hole” 7” (Gigantic Music, 2008)
 "Brother" / "Home" 7" split single with Murder By Death (self-released by Murder By Death, 2009)
 Underwater Nightmare 7” (Kemado Records, 2009)

Videography

Members
Greg Jamie - vocals, guitar, harmonium
Gabe Darling - backing vocals, ukulele, guitar, banjo, piano
David Rogers-Berry - drums, percussion
Bob Pycior - violin, piano
Jesse Newman - bass, piano

Past members:
Dan Sager - trombone, euphonium, keys
Tristan Palozola - trombone, percussion, auxiliary
Andrew Platt - bass guitar

References

External links
 O’Death’s Official Website
 O’Death on Myspace
 O’Death’s Daytrotter.com session
 O’Death feature in the Village Voice
 Live O’Death show on BandsThatJam
 City Slang's release of Broken Hymns, Limbs and Skin
 Interview with drummer David Rogers in Chief Magazine
 Twang Nation's Review of O’ Death's Broken Hymns, Limbs and Skin

American country music groups
Gothic country groups
Musical groups from Brooklyn
Musical groups established in 2003
City Slang artists
Northern Spy Records artists